or  is a lake in the municipality of Hamarøy in Nordland county, Norway. The European route E6 highway runs along the eastern and northern shores of the lake. The lake Strindvatnet lies just to the northwest and the lake Fjerdvatnet lies to the south of the lake.

See also
List of lakes in Norway

References

Hamarøy
Lakes of Nordland